Kilbarchan railway station was a railway station serving the village of Kilbarchan, Renfrewshire, Scotland. The station was part of the Dalry and North Johnstone Line on the Glasgow and South Western Railway.

History 

The station opened on 1 June 1905, and closed to passengers on 27 June 1966. The station was originally an island platform covered by an overhanging glass canopy. Access to the station, was via two glazed brick lined entrance ramps at either end of the platform; one leading to the archway under the green bridges in the village's main thoroughfare High Barholm, and the other leading down to a minor road near the Tandlehill estate. When the station was built, several of the cottages in the street had to be cleared to make way for the station entrance, and the bridges over the street. The station's platform remains partially intact. However, the trackbed is now part of National Cycle Route 7. Both station passenger entrance ramps were re-opened for access to the cycle route.

Gallery

References

Notes

Sources 
 

Disused railway stations in Renfrewshire
Railway stations in Great Britain opened in 1905
Railway stations in Great Britain closed in 1966
Beeching closures in Scotland
Former Glasgow and South Western Railway stations